Edward Isaac Sycamore was a British sailing skipper widely regarded as the leading British yacht skipper of his generation during 1890 to 1929. He was often referred to as Syc and later Old Syc.

Early life 
Sycamore was born in on 24 August 1855 at Duke Street, Chelmsford, the first son of John Sycamore and Eliza Moss. John was a maltster and came from East Doneyland (Rowhedge) on the river Colne.  Eliza’s family were farmers from St Lawrence on the south bank of the Blackwater. When Sycamore was twelve he joined the crew of a fishing boat.  After several seasons fishing he moved to yachting in 1875, working initially for the Marquis of Ailsa aboard the Lady Evelyn. Her voyages included trips to the West Indies and Mediterranean. In 1879 he went to work for H Atkins of Warrenpoint in the 20 ton cutter Louise.  His first command was the Amberwitch in 1884.  Following early successes in The Babe he rose rapidly to the top of his profession and remained there until his death on 9 April 1930. He married Elizabeth Rosetta Paine, daughter of a licensed victualler, on 2 November 1881.  The family moved to Brightlingsea in 1884 living at 34 Nelson Street and then from 1913 White Lodge.

Yachts commanded

Racing successes 
In 1911 The Yachtsman produced a table showing Sycamore’s successes. In 548 races he won 372 prizes, a success rate of 67.8% or a prize in every 1.47 starts.

Sycamore’s wins included six Royal Cups (one in Corsair and one in Carina for Admiral the Hon Victor Montagu; three in Bona in one year for the Duke of Abruzzi; one for Sir Thomas Lipton in Shamrock) and two Albert Cups, both in Bona.

War service 
At the outbreak of the First World War Isabella Alexandra and the Kaiser’s yacht Meteor were being towed to Cowes by a torpedo boat.  When war was declared they returned to Cuxhaven where the crew of Isabella Alexandra was interned.  They were released after about a week and returned to the UK via Denmark.  

Sycamore joined the Royal Navy as a Lieutenant RNVR in May 1917, aged nearly 62, and was appointed in command of ML 350 operating from the RNAS seaplane base at Newlyn.  In September 1917 he was appointed in command of ML 5 based at Calshot.  He remained in command of her, initially at Calshot and later Dundee, until he was demobbed on 15 September 1919.  With the formation of the RAF on 1 April 1918 he became a Captain RAF.  He is thought to have been the oldest person to have been commissioned into the Royal Navy and immediately given a command.  It is also thought he may have been the oldest officer in the RAF when he left.

Death 
Sycamore had been suffering from the accidental breaking of multiple ribs as he had been racing Sir Thomas Lipton's Shamrock on the Clyde During 1929. On 9 April 1930, he died at his home in Brightlingsea, at the age of 74.

Bibliography 

 The Field 1875
 Lloyds Yacht Register 1878
 Yachting Volumes 1 and 2.  Badminton Library 1894
 Yachting World Selected editions from 1895
 Leslie's. United States, F. Leslie, 1895.
 Report of the Special Committee of the New York Yacht Club New York 1896
 The House on Sport Ed W A Morgan.  Gale and Polden 1898
 Collier's. United States, Collier's, 1901.
 World Review. United States, World Review Company, 1901.
 Lawson History of the America’s Cup W M Thompson and T W Lawson.  Boston 1902
 Herd register. N.p., n.p, 1903.
 Adventure. United States, Ridgway, 1914.
 The Sphere: An Illustrated Newspaper for the Home. United Kingdom, n.p, 1922.
 The West Virginia Review. United States, Zurich Publishing Company, 1929.
 Yachting Monthly from 1906 to 1930
 The Reminiscences of Admiral Montagu The Hon V A Montagu.  Edward Arnold 1910
 The Complete Yachtsman B Heckstall-Smith and Capt E du Boulay. Methuen 1912
 All Hands on the Main Sheet Brooke Heckstall-Smith.  Grant Richards 1921
 Past Times and Pastimes Earl of Dunraven.  Hodder and Stoughton 1922
 The Rudder. United States, Fawcett Publications, 1926.
 Famous Yachts John Scott Hughes. Methuen 1929
 Log of the Shamrock 1929 W Wadley
 Leaves from the Lipton Logs Sir Thomas Lipton.  Hutchinson 1931
 Countryside Character. United Kingdom, Blandford Press, 1946.
 The King’s Sailing Master Douglas Dixon.  Harrap 1948
 Julyan, Herbert E.. Sixty Years of Yachts. United Kingdom, Hutchinson, 1950.
 Sacred Cowes Anthony Heckstall-Smith. Allan Wingate 1955
 Brooks, Jerome Edmund. The $30,000,000 Cup: The Stormy History of the Defense of the America's Cup. United States, Simon and Schuster, 1958.
 A Hundred Years of the America’s Cup F W Lipscomb.  Hugh Evelyn 1971
 The Northseamen John Leather.  Terence Dalton 1971
 The Racing Schooner Westward C P Hamilton-Adams.  Stanford Maritime 1976
 Salt-Water Palaces Maldwyn Drummond. Debrett 1979
 The Racing Yachts A B C Whipple. Time Life Books 1980
 The Early Challenges of the America’s Cup. A John and I Dear.  Columbus 1986
 The Story of the America’s Cup 1851-1992. Tim Thompson, Ranulf Rayner.  David& Charles c1993
 Yachting - a Turn of the Century Treasury. Ed Tony Meisel. Castle 1988
 The Man Who Invented Himself James Mackay.  Mainstream 1998
 An America’s Cup Treasury Gary Jobson.  The Mariners Museum 1999
 A Full Cup Michael d’Antonio. Riverhead Books 2010
 G L Watson Martin Black.  Peggy Bawn Press 2011
 Valkyrie Weather Daniel Simons. Printed privately 2012
 Temple to the Wind Christopher Pastore.  Lyons Press 2013
 Deer Isle’s Undefeated America’s Cup crews.  M J Gabrielson.  The History Press 2013
 Rowe, Mark. 5327: England in Peace and War. United Kingdom, Chaplin Books, 2013.
 Dublin Bay – The Cradle of Yacht Racing Hal Sisk.  2nd ed.  Peggy Bawn Press 2014
 Porter, Ken. Clacton-on-Sea and the Surrounding Coastline in the Great War. N.p., Pen & Sword Books, 2017.

References 

Yachting
America's Cup sailors
1855 births
1930 deaths